The 4th Washington D.C. Area Film Critics Association Awards, honoring the best in filmmaking in 2005, were given on December 12, 2005.

Winners and nominees

Best Film
Munich
 Brokeback Mountain
 Capote
 Crash
 Good Night, and Good Luck.

Best Director
Steven Spielberg – Munich
 George Clooney – Good Night, and Good Luck.
 Ron Howard – Cinderella Man
 Ang Lee – Brokeback Mountain
 Fernando Meirelles – The Constant Gardener

Best Actor
Philip Seymour Hoffman – Capote
 Terrence Howard – Hustle & Flow
 Heath Ledger – Brokeback Mountain
 Joaquin Phoenix – Walk the Line
 David Strathairn – Good Night, and Good Luck.

Best Actress
Reese Witherspoon – Walk the Line
 Joan Allen – The Upside of Anger
 Felicity Huffman – Transamerica
 Keira Knightley – Pride & Prejudice
 Charlize Theron – North Country

Best Supporting Actor
Paul Giamatti – Cinderella Man
 Matt Dillon – Crash
 Terrence Howard – Crash
 Geoffrey Rush – Munich
 Peter Sarsgaard – Jarhead

Best Supporting Actress
Amy Adams – Junebug
 Brenda Blethyn – Pride & Prejudice
 Taraji P. Henson – Hustle & Flow
 Catherine Keener – Capote
 Michelle Williams – Brokeback Mountain

Best Original Screenplay
Paul Haggis and Bobby Moresco – Crash
 George Clooney and Grant Heslov – Good Night, and Good Luck.
 Craig Brewer – Hustle & Flow
 Angus MacLachlan – Junebug
 Noah Baumbach – The Squid and the Whale

Best Adapted Screenplay
Dan Futterman – Capote
 Larry McMurty and Diana Ossana – Brokeback Mountain
 Arthur Golden, Robin Swicord, and Doug Wright – Memoirs of a Geisha
 Tony Kushner – Munich
 Deborah Moggach – Pride & Prejudice

Best Foreign Language Film
Kung Fu Hustle
 Innocent Voices
 Paradise Now
 Schultze Gets the Blues
 Turtles Can Fly

Best Animated Feature
Wallace and Gromit: The Curse of the Were-Rabbit
 Chicken Little
 Corpse Bride
 Madagascar
 Robots

Best Documentary
Enron: The Smartest Guys in the Room
 Grizzly Man
 Mad Hot Ballroom
 March of the Penguins
 Murderball

Best Breakthrough Performance
Terrence Howard – Hustle & Flow
 Amy Adams – Junebug
 Q'orianka Kilcher – The New World
 Taryn Manning – Hustle & Flow
 Aishwarya Rai – Bride and Prejudice

Best Ensemble
Crash
 Good Night, and Good Luck.
 Pride & Prejudice
 Rent
 Sin City

Best Art Direction
The Chronicles of Narnia: The Lion, the Witch and the Wardrobe
 Charlie and the Chocolate Factory
 Harry Potter and the Goblet of Fire
 Memoirs of a Geisha
 Star Wars: Episode III – Revenge of the Sith

References

External links
 2005 WAFCA Awards
 2005 WAFCA Awards at IMDb.com
 2005 WAFCA Awards at moviecitynews.com

2005
2005 film awards